15N may refer to: 

 Nitrogen-15 (15N), an isotope of nitrogen
 Δ15N, use of the isotope in paleoclimatology and hydrology
 Nitrogen-15 nuclear magnetic resonance spectroscopy, use of the isotope in spectroscopy
 Jenkins Airport (FAA code: N15), Wyoming, Kent County, Delaware, United States

See also
 N15 (disambiguation)